The British Embassy in South Korea is the diplomatic mission of the United Kingdom to South Korea. The British Ambassador to South Korea is Colin Crooks, since March 2022.

History 
Starting on 11 October 2007, the embassy stopped processing visa requests. Requests after this date are handled by the visa application centre.

The embassy began offering free English-language education and jobs training to North Korean defectors in May 2011.

In August 2017, the embassy returned part of the land it owned on the street along the Deoksu Palace to create a pedestrian path.

See also 

 South Korea–United Kingdom relations
 Embassy of South Korea, London

References

Notes

Citations 

Diplomatic missions of the United Kingdom
Diplomatic missions in Seoul
South Korea–United Kingdom relations
Jung District, Seoul